Harold Meyssen (born 24 July 1971 in Maaseik) is a Belgian professional football player. Meyssen is a left-footed midfielder with an excellent technique.

Meyssen started playing football with his local team Stokkem, but was discovered there by First division side FC Liège. Not achieving a breakthrough there, he signed for SK Tongeren, playing in second division. It would eventually be with Eendracht Aalst that Meyssen promoted to the Jupiler League. Meyssen would stay there for 6 seasons.

He then went to Austrian side SV Casino Salzburg, where he would stay for only one season. He returned to Belgium, signing for Standard Liège, the biggest club in Meyssen's career. After 3 seasons, Meyssen's role was played out, and he then chose the newly promoted Cercle Brugge to continue his career.

Meyssen is currently seeing out his career with Belgian coast team KV Oostende.

External links
Cerclemuseum.be 

1971 births
Living people
Belgian footballers
Association football midfielders
RFC Liège players
Sint-Truidense V.V. players
S.C. Eendracht Aalst players
FC Red Bull Salzburg players
Standard Liège players
Cercle Brugge K.S.V. players
Belgian expatriate footballers
Belgian Pro League players
Challenger Pro League players
Austrian Football Bundesliga players
Expatriate footballers in Austria
People from Maaseik
Footballers from Limburg (Belgium)